The Golden Comic Awards (GCA) is the annual awards for comics in Taiwan organized by the Ministry of Culture.

History
The first Golden Comic Awards was held in 2010.

Award categories
The award categories include Best New Talent, Best Cross-media Application, Best Editor, Best Comic Strip Collection, Best Comic for Kids, Best Comic for Teenage Boys, Best Comic for Teenage Girls, Best Comic for Young Adults, Comic of the Year and Special Contribution Award.

References

External links
  

2010 establishments in Taiwan
Taiwanese awards
Awards established in 2010